The Communist Party of Nepal was founded in Calcutta, India, on 15 September 1949.

Communist Party of Nepal may also refer to:
 Communist Party of Nepal (2006)
 Communist Party of Nepal (2013)
 Communist Party of Nepal (2014)
 Communist Party of Nepal (Amatya)
 Communist Party of Nepal (Burma)
 Communist Party of Nepal (Democratic)
 Communist Party of Nepal (Fourth Convention)
 Communist Party of Nepal (Janamukhi)
 Communist Party of Nepal (Malema)
 Communist Party of Nepal (Manmohan)
 Communist Party of Nepal (Maoist) (2014)
 Communist Party of Nepal (Maoist Centre)
 Communist Party of Nepal—Maoist
 Communist Party of Nepal (Marxist) (1986–91)
 Communist Party of Nepal (Marxist) (1991–2005)
 Communist Party of Nepal (Marxist) (2006)
 Communist Party of Nepal (Marxist–Leninist) (1978)
 Communist Party of Nepal (Marxist–Leninist) (1998)
 Communist Party of Nepal (Marxist–Leninist) (2002)
 Communist Party of Nepal (Marxist–Leninist–Maoist)
 Communist Party of Nepal (Marxist–Leninist–Maoist Centre)
 Communist Party of Nepal Marxist−Leninist (Samajbadi)
 Communist Party of Nepal (Masal) (historical)
 Communist Party of Nepal (Masal) (1999)
 Communist Party of Nepal (Masal) (2006)
 Communist Party of Nepal (Mashal)
 Communist Party of Nepal (Matri Samuha)
 Communist Party of Nepal (Pushpa Lal)
 Communist Party of Nepal (Rayamjhi)
 Communist Party of Nepal (Revolutionary Maoist)
 Communist Party of Nepal (Unified)
 Communist Party of Nepal (Unified Marxist–Leninist)
 Communist Party of Nepal (Unified Socialist)
 Communist Party of Nepal (United)
 Communist Party of Nepal (United) (1991–2005)
 Communist Party of Nepal (United Marxist)
 Communist Party of Nepal (Unity Centre)
 Communist Party of Nepal (Unity Centre–Masal)

See also 
 Communist Party of Nepal (Maoist) (disambiguation)
 Communist Party of Nepal (Marxist–Leninist) (disambiguation)
 List of communist parties in Nepal
 Nepal Communist Party